Episimus silvaticus is a species of moth of the family Tortricidae. It is found in Carchi Province, Ecuador.

The wingspan is about 18 mm. The forewings are pale ochreous with whitish dots and brownish dots and strigulation (fine streaks). The costal strigulae are whitish. The hindwings are brown grey.

Etymology
The species name refers to the silvatic (wooded) character of the habitat of the species.

References

	

Moths described in 2008
Olethreutini